Harvey Sheldon Rosen (born 29 March 1949) is an American economist and academic. Prior to his retirement and subsequent appointment as Emeritus Professor in 2019, Rosen was the John L. Weinberg Professor of Economics and Business Policy at Princeton University, and former chairperson of the Council of Economic Advisers. His research focuses on public finance. Harvard University economist and former Council of Economic Advisers chairman Greg Mankiw credits Rosen as one of four mentors who taught him how to practice economics, along with Alan Blinder, Larry Summers, and Stanley Fischer.

Early life and education
Rosen attended the University of Michigan, where he was a member of the Phi Beta Kappa Society and received a bachelor's degree in economics in 1970. Rosen also attended Harvard University, where he received his master's degree and Ph.D. in economics in 1972 and 1974, respectively.

Career
Rosen has been an Associate Researcher at the National Bureau of Economic Research since 1978, where he has focused on taxes and commerce. In 1981 he was a visiting scholar at the Hoover Institute, and in 1986 was a Fellow at the Econometric Society. From 1989-1991 he worked at the United States Department of Treasury as the Deputy Assistant Secretary for Tax Analysis. He served as a member of the Council of Economic Advisors from 2003-2005, and served as Chairman in 2005. Rosen is currently the John L. Weinberg Professor of Economics and Business Policy at Princeton University, where he has previously served as Chairman of the Department from 1993 to 1996, and was a Co-Director at the Princeton University Center for Economic Policy Studies from 1993 to 2011. His work at Princeton focuses on teaching undergraduate courses in public finance, taxation, and introductory microeconomics, and graduate courses in public finance.

In 2013, Rosen was a signatory to an amicus curiae brief submitted to the Supreme Court in support of same-sex marriage during the Hollingsworth v. Perry case.

References

External links

 C.V.
 Biography
 Mankiw's "Rules of Thumb"

1949 births
21st-century American economists
Fellows of the Econometric Society
Harvard University alumni
Living people
Princeton University faculty
University of Michigan College of Literature, Science, and the Arts alumni
National Bureau of Economic Research
Chairs of the United States Council of Economic Advisers